The Sudanese Air Force is the air force operated by the Republic of the Sudan. As such it is part of the Sudanese Armed Forces.

History
The Sudanese Air Force was founded immediately after Sudan gained independence from the United Kingdom in 1956. The British assisted in the Air Force's establishment, providing equipment and training. Four new Hunting Provost T Mk 51s were delivered for jet training in 1961. In 1958, the Sudanese Air Force's transport wing acquired its first aircraft, a single Hunting President. In 1960 the Sudanese Air Force received an additional four re-furbished RAF Provosts and two more Hunting Presidents. Also in 1960, the transport wing's capability was increased by the addition of two Pembroke C Mk 54s. The Air Force gained its first combat aircraft when 12 Jet Provosts with a close air support capability were delivered in 1962. In the 1960s, the Soviet Union and China started supplying the Sudanese Air Force with aircraft. This included supply of Shenyang F-5 fighters (F-5/FT-5 variants).

Aircraft
The air force flies a mixture of transport planes, fighter jets and helicopters sourced from places including the European Union, Russia, China and the United States. However, not all the aircraft are in a fully functioning condition and the availability of spare parts is limited.  In 1991, the two main air bases were at the capital Khartoum and Wadi Sayyidna near Omdurman.

On 4 April 2001, a Sudanese Antonov An-24 aircraft crashed in Adaril (Adar Yeil, Adar Yale), Sudan. The fifteen dead included a general, seven lieutenant generals, three brigadiers, a colonel, a lieutenant colonel and a corporal.

Sudan has also made a successful deal to buy two different batches of 12 MiG-29 Russian fighter jets each. There are 23 MiG-29s in active service as of late 2008. However, the rebel Justice and Equality Movement claimed to have shot down one MiG-29 with large-caliber machine-gun fire on 10 May 2008, killing the pilot of the plane, a retired Russian Air Force fighter pilot; the Sudanese government denied the allegation. South Sudan also claimed to have shot down a Sudanese MiG-29 during the 2012 border conflict.

During May, June, and August 2011, members of the UN Panel of Experts on the Sudan documented the following aircraft in Darfur, potentially indicating violations of United Nations Security Council Resolution 1556:'Letter dated 24 January 2011 from former members of the Panel of Experts on the Sudan established pursuant to Resolution 1591 (2005) and renewed pursuant to Resolution 1945 (2010) addressed to the Chairman of the Security Council Committee established pursuant to Resolution 1591 (2005) concerning the Sudan, page 30
Five Sukhoi Su-25 ground attack aircraft (tail numbers 201, 204, 205, 207, 212)
Three Mi-17 transport helicopters (tail numbers 525, 540, 543)
Nine Mi-24 attack helicopters (tail numbers 928, 937, 938, 939, 942, 943, 947, 948 stationed at El Fasher and Nyala, and an additional Mi-24 which crashed near El Fasher on 18 April 2011.) Satellite imagery also indicates that a total of five other attack helicopters were present at Kutum, N Darfur, in April 2011, and at El Geneima in February 2011, but panel members have not determined whether they were introduced from outside Darfur in addition to those listed above, or moved from within Darfur.

In August 2013, pictures showed Su-24's in Sudanese colors, reporting that the aircraft were among the ex Belarusian Air Force Su-24's retired in 2012. Various reports have said that the air force uses Iranian drones such as the Ghods Ababil.

Current inventory

Retired  
Previous notable aircraft operated were the BAC Jet Provost,  Douglas C-47, MBB Bo 105, and the Agusta-Bell 212 helicopter.

Armament

Missiles

Air Defense

References

Bibliography
 Silvester, John. "Call to Arms: The Percival Sea Prince and Pembroke". Air Enthusiast, No. 55, Autumn 1994, pp. 56–61. 

 
Military of Sudan
Military units and formations established in 1956
1956 establishments in Sudan